Global Television is a Bangladeshi Bengali-language satellite and cable television channel owned by Globe Multimedia Limited, a subsidiary of Globe Pharma Group of Companies. It commenced official broadcasts on 30 June 2022 with the "Bishwamay Protidin" (বিশ্বময় প্রতিদিন) slogan, and is based in Tejgaon, Dhaka. The channel's programming consists of both entertainment and news.

History 
Member of Parliament Md. Mamunur Rashid Kiron-owned Global Television's license to broadcast was granted by the Bangladesh Telecommunication Regulatory Commission in January 2017. Its frequency allocation was granted in May 2018. Before its launch, Global Television had uploaded its content, including dramas, onto its YouTube channel, which gained one million subscribers by the end of 2021.

The channel commenced test broadcasts on 20 November 2021. On 18 June 2022, journalists working for the channel formed human chains in protest against attacks against journalists. Global Television commenced official transmissions on 30 June 2022 at 16:00 (BST), as the thirty-eighth television channel overall to be launched in Bangladesh. On 24 July 2022, three new drama television series, Monjil, Nirdosh, and Songsar, premiered on Global Television.

Programming 
 Ahladi Ahar
 Alokito Bhubon
 Aral
 Bioscope
 Global Music Night
 Monjil
 Naach Moyuri Naach
 Nirdosh
 Royal Chef Rannaghor
 Showbiz Today
 Songsar
 Tilottoma

References

External links 
 
 Global Television on Facebook
 Global Television on YouTube

Television channels in Bangladesh
Television channels and stations established in 2022
Mass media in Dhaka
2022 establishments in Bangladesh